Alverstone is a village 2 miles from the east coast of the Isle of Wight, near Sandown. When Richard Webster became Chief Justice of England in 1900, he chose the title Lord Alverstone because it was the title he was permitted to choose which was "closest" to Sandown, one of his favourite locales. Alverstone Manor is located here.

Prince Albert was instrumental in creating a 'model' brickworks in Alverstone in the middle of the 19th century (but that is a different 'Alverstone', east of Whippingham Isle of Wight, on the southern edge of QV's Osborne Estate). There is evidence from an archaeological dig in Alverstone of a Roman military presence in the area.

The Newport Junction Railway opened a station at Alverstone in the 1870s, and the station first appeared in a public schedule in June 1876. Alverstone railway station finally closed 2 June 1956. The original wooden station was replaced with one built with earth and clinkers, with wood siding.

There are many wetlands around Alverstone. Nature lovers enjoy visiting the Alverstone Marshes.

Alverstone Mead is southeast of Alverstone, and south of the cycleway between Sandown and Newport. Since 1993 the lease is held by the Wight Nature Council. It was once part of the Lower Borthwood Farm.

Transport is provided by Wightbus route 23, running between Newport and Shanklin.

References

External links

  Alverstone Mead - Wetland focal Nature Reserve, Newchurch Parish website
 

Villages on the Isle of Wight